La gallina clueca ("The Broody Hen") is a 1941 Mexican film. It was directed by Fernando de Fuentes.

Reception
El Tiempo was very positive when describing La gallina clueca, saying that its plot had "amazing realism" as well as being "moving" and "interesting".

References

External links
 

1941 films
1940s Spanish-language films
Films directed by Fernando de Fuentes
Mexican black-and-white films
Mexican drama films
1941 drama films
1940s Mexican films